Ichthyophis pseudangularis is a species of caecilian endemic to Sri Lanka. It is found in a range of natural and man-made habitats: forests, rubber plantations, paddy fields, rural gardens and farms, wetlands (boggy and muddy areas), and pastureland.

The holotype measured  in total length.

References

pseudangularis
Amphibians described in 1965
Amphibians of Sri Lanka
Endemic fauna of Sri Lanka